Tom Sharpe is an American born musician, composer and recording artist who is principal performer and artistic director of the Sharpe World Music Ensemble.  He is best known as the drummer for the Grammy award-winning group, Mannheim Steamroller, as well as Dennis DeYoung, a founding member of the rock band Styx.

The title track of his debut CD Like Setting Myself on Fire was voted Grand Prize Winner - World Music Song of the Year by the John Lennon Songwriting Contest. "Trance-formation”, another album track, received honors as one of three finalists in the same category.

On October 28, 2014 Sharpe released his second solo CD Lifting the World via Marathon Records.

Sharpe is an alumnus of the Interlochen Arts Academy and holds the degrees Bachelor of Music and Master of Music from DePaul University in Chicago.

Tom Sharpe is endorsed and represented by the Yamaha Corporation of America, Sabian Cymbals, Vater Sticks and Mallets, Aquarian Drum Heads, Black Swamp Percussion, HipTrix Glowing Percussion, the Illinois Arts Council, and Urban Gateways Center for Arts Education.

Sharpe currently resides in Oswego, Illinois, but grew up in Romeo, Michigan.

References 

American male musicians
Living people
Year of birth missing (living people)